Suraginella is a genus of flies in the family Athericidae.

Species
Suraginella macalpinei Stuckenberg, 2000

References

Athericidae
Brachycera genera
Taxa named by Brian Roy Stuckenberg
Diptera of Australasia